The Fillmore Detroit is a multi-use entertainment venue operated by Live Nation.  Built in 1925, the Fillmore Detroit was known for most of its history as the State Theatre. It is located near the larger Fox Theatre in the Detroit Theatre District along Woodward Avenue across from Comerica Park and Grand Circus Park. The Fillmore Detroit features a theatre with a Grand Lobby and three levels of seating, as well as the State Bar & Grill which has a separate entrance and is open when the theatre is not hosting events. The Detroit Music Awards are held annually at The Fillmore Detroit in April. The building was listed on the National Register of Historic Places in 1982.

History
The site of the Fillmore was previously home to an earlier theatre known as the Central and then, from 1913-1923, as the Grand Circus Theatre. This theatre was demolished to make way for the 1925 construction of what was then called the Francis Palms Building. The building was named for Francis Palms, a Belgian native who moved to Detroit in 1832 and made his fortune in real estate development. Palms' descendants continued in real estate as the Palms Realty Company, and constructed this building at a time when Detroit's population and the popularity of movies was booming.

The theatre was constructed in 1925 as a movie house in the Renaissance Revival style of architecture. C. Howard Crane was the original architect, and the building is still called the Francis Palms Building.

The theatre was originally called the State Theatre when it opened in 1925. It was renamed the Palms-State Theatre in 1937 and the Palms Theatre in 1946. In 1982 it was renamed back to the State Theatre. And in 2007 (as a national re-branding) it was renamed, this time the Fillmore Theatre.

The building is twelve stories high and covered with terra cotta, with an eight-story auditorium extending to the rear of the building. The office tower has elaborate Beaux-Arts Italian Renaissance decorations on all but the ground floor, which was modernized in about 1960.

Current use
The Fillmore Detroit is a concert venue for popular music acts as well as hosting many special events. The venue's current seating capacity is 2,900, 2,084 for reserved seating. The mezzanine and balcony levels still contain their original theatre seating.

In March 2007, Live Nation announced that the State Theatre would become the Fillmore Detroit as part of a multi-city extension of the Fillmore brand, similar to what has been done previously with the House of Blues franchise. Various changes were implemented to evoke the Fillmore's iconic venue in San Francisco, California. The official inaugural show under the Fillmore Detroit re-branding was Fergie's June 13, 2007, performance.

Live Nation has continued the gradual restoration of the Italian Renaissance theatre. The outer lobby and rotunda lobby were restored in the 1990s. The grand foyer columns and auditorium proscenium arch were more recent restorations. Live Nation has restored the barrel vaulted ceiling of the three story grand foyer, and has plans to work on the upper reaches of the auditorium in increments.

American Idol
In 2015, American Idol held semi-finals at The Fillmore Detroit. Pre-recorded episodes were aired on Fox starting on February 25, followed by two live episodes, the series' first broadcast from outside Los Angeles, on March 3 and 4.

Gallery

See also
 Fox Theatre
 House Of Blues

References

Further reading

External links

The Fillmore Detroit website
Cinema Treasures website of old movie houses profiles The State Theatre.
Fillmore Detroit Myspace Page
Fillmore Detroit reopens after a summer of restoration — Detroit News, October 5, 2018
Fillmore marquee to be completed this month, December 2018 — Detroit News, December 11, 2018

Cinemas and movie theaters in Michigan
Theatres in Detroit
Downtown Detroit
Concert halls in Michigan
Movie palaces
Music venues in Michigan
Performing arts centers in Michigan
Event venues established in 1925
National Register of Historic Places in Detroit
Theatres on the National Register of Historic Places in Michigan
1925 establishments in Michigan
Woodward Avenue